is a 2014 Japanese historical drama television series and the 53rd NHK taiga drama. The series was broadcast from January 5 to December 21, 2014, and ran a total of 50 episodes. The drama depicts the life of Kuroda Kanbei (played by Junichi Okada), a retainer of daimyō Kodera Masamoto of Harima Province, and a strategist for daimyō Toyotomi Hideyoshi.

Plot
The drama tells the story of Kuroda Kanbei, a son of Kuroda Mototaka, chief retainer of Kodera Masamoto who ruled Harima Province (currently Hyōgo Prefecture) in the 16th century. In troubled times, Kanbei persuades Kodera to join forces with the all-powerful Oda Nobunaga. Though imprisoned by Araki Murashige and lamed for life, Kanbei endures hardships and later becomes a strategist for Toyotomi Hideyoshi. His son Kuroda Nagamasa serves Tokugawa Ieyasu after the death of Toyotomi.

Production

Screenwriter – Yoichi Maekawa
Music – Yugo Kanno
Titling – Shoshu
Narrator – Shiho Fujimura→Shuko Hirose
Historical research – Tetsuo Owada
Sword fight arranger - Kunishirō Hayashi
Architectural research – Kiyoshi Hirai
Clothing research – Kiyoko Koizumi
Production coordinator – Takashi Nakamura
Director – Kenji Tanaka, Kazuhiro Motoki
Performed by Warsaw National Philharmonic Orchestra
Theme performed by NHK Symphony Orchestra

Cast

Kuroda family
Kuroda Kanbei: Junichi Okada
Kushihashi Teru: Miki Nakatani
Kuroda Nagamasa: Tori Matsuzaka
Kuroda Mototaka: Kyōhei Shibata
Kuroda Kyumu: Daisuke Ryu
Kuroda Shigetaka: Raita Ryū
Kuriyama Zensuke: Gaku Hamada
Mori Tahei: Mokomichi Hayami
Inoue Kuroemon Yurifusa: Issei Takahashi
Gotō Matabei: Takashi Tsukamoto
Mori Kohei: Sansei Shiomi
Mori Buhei: Masaru Nagai
Ito: Mitsuki Takahata
Omichi: Rila Fukushima
Eihime: Miyu Yoshimoto

Ibuki
Ibuki Zenemon: Isao Bito
Tatsu: Nao Minamisawa

Kodera Clan
Kodera Masamoto: Tsurutaro Kataoka
Kon: Saki Takaoka
Kushihashi Sakyonosuke: Toru Masuoka
Kushihashi Sayonoshin: Nobuaki Kaneko
Ogō Yoshitoshi: Tsutomu Isobe

Oda Clan
Oda Nobunaga: Yōsuke Eguchi
No: Yuki Uchida
Akechi Mitsuhide: Shunputei Koasa
Niwa Nagahide: Hiroshi Katsuno
Shibata Katsuie: Yoshimasa Kondo
Dota Gozen: Naoko Otani
Yasuke: Bernard Ackah
Oichi: Kyoko Uchida
Oda Nobutada: Tomoya Nakamura
Oda Nobutaka: Masei Nakayama
Oda Nobukatsu: Shōta Kosakai
Mori Ranmaru: Hayato Kakizawa

Toyotomi Clan
Toyotomi Hideyoshi: Naoto Takenaka
One: Hitomi Kuroki
Takenaka Hanbei: Shosuke Tanihara
Hachisuka Koroku: Pierre Taki
Ishida Mitsunari: Kei Tanaka
Cha-cha: Fumi Nikaidō
Fukushima Masanori: Hideo Ishiguro
Katō Kiyomasa: Shinnosuke Abe
Toyotomi Hidetsugu: Akiyoshi Nakao
Konishi Yukinaga: Shugo Oshinari
Magdalena: Mako Ishino
Sassa Narimasa: Ryosuke Otani
Ukita Hideie: Kouhei Takeda
Kobayakawa Hideaki: Yosuke Asari
Ōtani Yoshitsugu: Shingo Murakami
Ōno Harunaga: Yasuhito Shimao

Tokugawa Clan
Tokugawa Ieyasu: Akira Terao
Ii Naomasa: Mikihisa Azuma
Honda Tadakatsu: Masayuki Shionoya
Sakakibara Yasumasa: Ikuji Nakamura

Mōri Clan
Mōri Terumoto: Kota Miura
Kobayakawa Takakage: Shingo Tsurumi
Kikkawa Motoharu: Kazutoyo Yoshimi
Ankokuji Ekei: Kazuhiro Yamaji
Ukita Naoie: Takanori Jinnai
Shimizu Muneharu: Takashi Ukaji
Kikkawa Motonaga: Masayuki Deai

Amago Clan
Yamanaka Shikanosuke: Tetsuya Bessho
Amago Katsuhisa: Kinihiro Suda
Kamei Korenori: Takaaki Seki

Others
Araki Murashige: Tetsushi Tanaka
Dashi: Mirei Kiritani
Ashikaga Yoshiaki: Mitsuru Fukikoshi
Sen no Rikyū: Masatō Ibu
Takayama Ukon/Dom Justo Takayama: Toma Ikuta
Maeda Toshiie: Tadashi Yokouchi
Yoshida Kanemi: Masami Horiuchi
Otsuru: Yui Ichikawa
Ōtomo Sōrin: Tsunehiko Kamijō
Utsunomiya Shigefusa: Takehiro Murata
Hōjō Ujimasa: Goro Ibuki
Hōjō Ujinao: Masayoshi Haneda
Matsunaga Hisahide: Mickey Curtis
Gnecchi-Soldo Organtino: Bob Werley
Luís Fróis: Oziel Nozaki
Gaspar Coelho: Ricardo Teixeira

TV schedule

Books
NHK Taiga Drama Story Gunshi Kanbei Vol.1  (Official guide)
Yoichi Maekawa and Kuniko Aoki, Taiga Drama Gunshi Kanbei'', Tokyo, NHK Publishing Co., Ltd., 2014 (novelisation)

References

External links
Official NHK Taiga Drama Gunshi Kanbei

Taiga drama
2014 Japanese television series debuts
2014 Japanese television series endings
Catholic Church in Japan
Cultural depictions of Akechi Mitsuhide
Cultural depictions of Oda Nobunaga
Cultural depictions of Tokugawa Ieyasu
Cultural depictions of Toyotomi Hideyoshi
Television series set in the 16th century
Television shows set in Osaka
Television shows set in Hyōgo Prefecture
Television shows set in Fukuoka Prefecture
Japanese invasions of Korea (1592–1598) in fiction